Hemendra Singh Rao Pawar (born 18 September 1968), is the present titular Maharaja of Dhar State. He is a descendant of the Pawar (Puar) dynasty that ruled Dhar State.

He was crowned as the Maharaja of Dhar State on 15 January 2015 at the Dhar Rajwada (Old Palace). Such a ceremony was last held on 1 August 1926 when the late Col. HH Maharaja Anand Rao IV Pawar ascended the Gadi of the Maratha Puars-Pawars (Parmars) of Dhar State.

He is married to Shaila Raje Pawar and has a son Prathmeshwar Singh Rao Pawar. He was educated at Daly College, Indore

See also
List of Maratha dynasties and states
Maratha Empire
Maratha
Dhar State
Dewas Junior
Dewas Senior

References

 Hindustan Times
 Times of India articles
 Free Press Journal

Maharajas of Madhya Pradesh
1968 births
People from Dhar
People from Madhya Pradesh
Living people